Brychaetus is an extinct genus of prehistoric bony tongue fish known from the Late Cretaceous to the Eocene. It contains a single species, Brychaetus muelleri. Its fossils have been found in Europe, North America, and northern Africa. This freshwater fish had very long teeth which are half bone and half enamel. It's thought to be related to the modern day arowana although the presence of a sclerotic ossicle in the fossil record would suggest that they were a deep water fish unlike modern day arowanas which are surface feeders.

See also
Prehistoric fish
List of prehistoric bony fish

References

Monotypic ray-finned fish genera
Prehistoric ray-finned fish genera
Osteoglossidae
Prehistoric fish of Africa
Prehistoric fish of Europe